Fūsen gum is a brand of bubble gum manufactured by Japanese confectionery manufacturer Marukawa. "Fūsen" (風船) means balloon in Japanese.The product is exported around the world and is particularly popular in Kuwait, India, Iran and Pakistan. Fūsen is notable for the water-based temporary tattoo that comes in the product's wrapper. Its wrapper has many different styles. Its ingredients include sugar, gum base, glucose, corn syrup, flavouring substance (artificial), citric acid and added colors (grape skin extracts). 1 unit weighs 0.147oz or 4.15g.

External links
 Nostalgic Bubble Gum?
 Marukawa Fusen Bubble gum home page

Chewing gum
Japanese snack food